The Roman Catholic Diocese of Almenara is a diocese located in the city of Almenara, Minas Gerais, in the Ecclesiastical province of Diamantina in Brazil.

History
 March 28, 1981: Established as Diocese of Almenara from the Diocese of Araçuaí and Diocese of Teófilo Otoni

Leadership
 Bishops of Almenara (Latin Rite)
 José Geraldo Oliveira do Valle, C.S.S. (10 May 1982  – 31 Aug 1988), appointed Coadjutor Bishop of Guaxupé, Minas Gerais
 Diogo Johannes Antonius Reesink, O.F.M. (2 Aug 1989  – 25 Mar 1998), appointed Bishop of Teófilo Otoni, Minas Gerais
 Hugo María van Steekelenburg, O.F.M. (23 Jun 1999  – 19 Jun 2013)
 Bishop José Carlos Brandão Cabral (15 Sep 2013–present)

References

 GCatholic.org
 Catholic Hierarchy

Roman Catholic dioceses in Brazil
Christian organizations established in 1981
Almenara, Roman Catholic Diocese of
Roman Catholic dioceses and prelatures established in the 20th century